Love Never Fails may refer to:

 Love Never Fails (B. E. Taylor album), 2006
 Love Never Fails (Barbara Fairchild, Connie Smith and Sharon White album), 2003
 Love Never Fails (Jahméne Douglas album), 2013
 Love Never Fails (Micah Stampley album), 2013
 "Love Never Fails" (Brandon Heath song), 2009
 "Love Never Fails" (Kathie Lee Gifford song), 2000; covered by Sandy & Junior, 2002

See also
Love Never Faileth, a 1984 book by Eknath Easwaran